Vampire Clan is a 2002 American drama/horror film directed by John Webb.  It received its premiere screening at the 2002 Dances With Films Festival.

Plot
Based on the horrific true story of the 1996 "Vampire Killings" in Florida, the film follows the police investigation of five Goth teenagers who claimed to be real-life vampires. They drank each other's blood and embraced the occult. But they were also ordinary, middle-class kids looking for an outlet for their angst and morbid curiosity. Somewhere along their road trip to New Orleans, their fantasy life became all too real. Now the police have two savagely beaten corpses on their hands—parents of the teenaged vampires. What really happened? And how did these normal kids become such monsters?

Cast
 Drew Fuller as Roderick 'Rod' Justin Farrell
 Alexandra Breckenridge as Charity Lynn Keesee
 Timothy DePriest as Howard Scott Anderson
 Marina Black as Dana Lynn Cooper
 Jennifer Edwards as Jodi Remington 
 Kelly Kruger as Heather Ann Wendorf
 Richard Gilliland as Sgt. Ben Odom
 Larry Dirk as Sheriff Mike Dane
 Stacy Hogue as Jeni Wendorf
 Spencer Redford as Jeanine Leclair
 Mimi Craven as Ruth Wendorf
David Wells as Rick Wendorf

Reception
Critical reception for the film has been mixed. JoBlo.com was also mixed, stating that it "had some decent acting and tunes and at times, slick directing, but on the whole, rubbed me the wrong way from every freaking angle. I just couldn’t find an anchor to the story and I truly, and I mean TRULY, despised the characters in it." Variety panned the film, writing "From its ripped-from-the-headlines topic of teen bloodsuckers to the blandness of a low-budgeter shockingly low on shocks, true story of the murder of a family is translated by scripter Aaron Pope into a woefully standard depiction of wayward youth."

References

External links
 
 

2002 horror films
2002 films
American horror films
2000s English-language films
2000s American films
English-language horror films